The Jucá River is a river of Ceará state in eastern Brazil. It flows through the municipality of Parambu.

See also
List of rivers of Ceará

References
Brazilian Ministry of Transport

Rivers of Ceará